Andrii Pavlovych Zahorodniuk (born 5 December 1976) is a Ukrainian entrepreneur and politician.From 2015 to 2017, Zahorodniuk headed the Reform Project Office at the Ministry of Defense of Ukraine. He was the Minister of Defence of Ukraine from 29 August 2019 to 4 March 2020.

Biography 
Zahorodniuk studied law at the Taras Shevchenko National University of Kyiv. He also graduated from Warwick University and Oxford University.

Zahorodniuk is the CEO of Discovery Drilling Equipment.

From 2015 to 2017, Zahorodniuk headed the Reform Project Office at the Ministry of Defense of Ukraine. In 2018 he was a member of the Reform Project Office under the Ministry of Defense.

Zahorodniuk became an advisor to the President of Ukraine Volodymyr Zelensky after Zelensky was elected president in the 2019 Ukrainian presidential election.

On 9 July 2019, President Zelensky appointed Zahorodniuk to serve as a Member of the supervisory board at Ukroboronprom.

On 29 August 2019 Zahorodniuk was appointed Minister of Defence in the Honcharuk Government. On 4 March 2020 he was succeeded (in this post) by Andrii Taran.

See also 
 Honcharuk Government

References

External links 
 MoD of Ukraine

1976 births
Living people
Politicians from Kyiv
University of Kyiv, Law faculty alumni
Alumni of the University of Warwick
Alumni of Saïd Business School
Ukrainian chief executives
21st-century Ukrainian businesspeople
Presidential advisors
Defence ministers of Ukraine
21st-century Ukrainian politicians